John Patrick Connolly (born 29 August 1950) is an English businessman. He is the chairman of Eisner Advisory Group LLC, Interpath Advisory, Stonehage Fleming and Metric Capital Partners. He was chairman of two FTSE-100 companies, G4S and Amec Foster Wheeler. Prior to that he was senior partner and chief executive of Deloitte in the UK, and global managing partner and global chairman of Deloitte until his retirement from the firm in June 2011.

Early life
John Connolly was born on 29 August 1950. His father was John Connolly and his mother, Mary Morrison. He was educated at St Bede's College, Manchester.

Career
Connolly ran an office for Deloitte in the Middle East, was partner-in-charge of its Leeds office and a regional managing partner. He was also head of the London office and UK managing partner. He was also global managing partner and global chairman of Deloitte until mid 2011.

Connolly transformed Deloitte in UK – once the smallest of the Big Four accountants – after masterminding a merger with Arthur Andersen in 2002. Rivals predicted that Andersen, which collapsed because of its association with Enron, would be a bad fit with Deloitte. However, under Connolly’s stewardship, the two gradually merged and avoided mass defections.  He has also insisted that the firm retains its consulting arm, the only big accountancy practice to do so, and plays a significant role in advising some of the firm’s biggest clients.

In 2008, Connolly was named at number 58 in the Times Power 100, the annually compiled list of men and women who hold sway over British business, ranking 34 places above Sir Richard Branson.  Connolly was also named as the Personality of the Year in the Accountancy Age Awards 2008, described as “the accountancy world’s equivalent of Sir Alex Ferguson”.

Connolly steered Deloitte to a credit-crunch-busting 16 per cent jump in 2008 pre-tax profits to £654 million. Global revenues for the accounting and professional services giant were up by 12 per cent to £2.01 billion in the year to 31 May 2008, comfortably beating its £2 billion target for this financial year. Connolly cemented his status as Britain’s highest paid accountant in 2008, when his £5.7million pay packet was disclosed in the company’s annual results.  In 2009, Connolly's pay   was reported to have decreased slightly to £5.22million.

Connolly was previously the chairman for Hampshire-based debt recovery agency, Capquest. Capquest was one of the market leaders of the debt recovery industry until board changes took place in 2012.

Connolly became embroiled with the Barlow Clowes affair. He was heavily criticised by the accountancy profession in 1995 for his role when the report into the scandal was published.

Connolly served as the chairman of G4S from January 2012 until May 2021. He also served as the chairman of Amec Foster Wheeler.

In October 2016, Connolly founded Cogital (now Azets), a British multinational accounting and business services company, with the financial backing of the private equity firm Hg Capital. Accountancy Age has reported that Cogital and its private equity backers have big plans to challenge the dominance of the Big Four accounting firms.

Philanthropy and equine interests
Connolly served as the chairman of the Great Ormond Street Hospital until July 2019.

Connolly is also a racing fanatic, owning four horses at a stable near the South Coast.  His horses are Crimson Monarch, Tungsten Strike, Night Crescendo and Gaia Prince. He also has an interest in others 'horses through the formation of the Green Dot Partnership, a racehorse syndicate that raised £630,000 from Deloitte partners to buy yearlings.  The registered colours are blue, with a big green dot.  Fellow partners have invested between £5,000 and £25,000.

Personal life
Connolly married Odile Lesley Griffith in 1992. He has a son and a daughter.

References 

Living people
1950 births
People educated at St Bede's College, Manchester
English accountants
Deloitte people
British corporate directors
British chairpersons of corporations